Nodaway Valley Community School District is a school district headquartered in Greenfield, Iowa, in the southwest of the state.

It serves sections of Adair County, with small sections of Madison County. It serves Greenfield, Bridgewater, and Fontanelle.

History 
It was formed on July 1, 2000, by the consolidation of the districts of Greenfield and Bridgewater–Fontanelle. Residents of the districts approved a referendum held on September 14, 1999, to consolidate.

Schools
 Nodaway Valley High School (Greenfield)
 Nodaway Valley Middle School (Fontanelle)
 The building opened in 2000.
 Nodaway Valley Elementary School (Greenfield)
 The current building opened in August 2017.

Facts and figures

Enrollment

References

External links 
 Nodaway Valley Community School District
 

Greenfield, Iowa
School districts in Iowa
School districts established in 2000
2000 establishments in Iowa
Education in Adair County, Iowa
Education in Madison County, Iowa